Kaimal is an aristocratic title that was historically used by various chiefs from the Nair caste during the feudal period of what is now the Indian state of Kerala. The Kaimals were one of the highest caste of Hindus in Kerala and South India in general. It was the title awarded to notable Samanthan and Kiryathil Nair families. Various families have used the title, including the Kaimals of Koratti, Angi and Koddachery.

Portuguese ascendancy
The Fifth Portuguese India Armada under Afonso de Albuquerque arrived in 1503, just in time to save the King of Cochin from the Zamorin of Calicut. The Portuguese then turned their attention to the chieftains who had fought against the Cochin army, and committed atrocities wherein they killed local inhabitants in large numbers and also indiscriminately burnt down towns and villages.

The Portuguese and the king subsequently entered into a treaty with the Anchi Kaimals whereby they accepted the overlordship of the Cochin throne.

The Dutch in Cochin
On 26 October 1662, the rulers of Kochi successfully defeated the Portuguese who wanted to change the statue of Kochi from that of an ally to that of a vassal. They exploited the rivalry between the Dutch and the Portuguese, and made the Dutch their ally in the war against the Portuguese forces. The Kochi kings fought this battle with the assistance rendered by the Anchi Kaimals.

T. I. Poonen says

Regional rulers
The name "Kaimal" is derived from the word "Kai", which means "hand" in Malayalam, signifying power. Earlier Kaimals were recognized as regional chieftains. Major areas of Vaikom, Niranampetti, Irinjalakuda, Ranni, Koratti, Niranampetti, Angi and Koddachery were under the control of Kaimal Naduvazhis. The old name of Eranakulam was Anjukaimalnadu (The land of the Anju Kaimals).

Chiefs of Cochin 
K P Padmanabha Menon, in his History of Kerala: Vol 2, mentions the Anji Kaimals, whose chief was Cheranellur Kartha, as owning all of Eranakulam. In fact, Eranakulam was known as Anji Kaimal in the early maps of Kerala. The Dutch Malabar records of 1910 (Dutch Records No 13), show a map from the year 1740 that illustrates the area of Anjikaimal as being almost twice as large as the Cochin State. The other chiefs he mentions quoting Gollennesse (The Dutch East India Company) are: 1) Moorianatt Nambiar, 2) Paliath Achan (mentioned above), 3) Codacherry (Kotasseri) Kaimal, 4) Caimalieone of Corretty, 5) Changera Codda Kaimal, and 6) Panamoocattu Kaimal (Panambakadu Kaimal). The last four Kaimals are known as the Kaimals of Nandietter Naddu. The Kaimals of Nandietter Naddu had Nair troops numbering 43,000 in 1694, according to Heer Van Reede of the Dutch East India Company. The Kaimal royal members had also moved to Goa during the Portuguese era.

End of power
P. K. S. Raja gives the following factors for the end of feudalism in Travancore and Cochin:

His violation in his dealings with the Ettuveetil Pillamar of the principal custom of Malabar that a Nair lord would not be punished
His dealing with Raja of Quillon (his own family) where instead of making a conquered chief a subordinate, the Raja was made a state prisoner
His invitation of Hyder Ali to aid him in suppressing the revolt of the "whole country North of Kayamkulam" who did not appreciate his policies and his treatment of the nobility
The treaty between Cochin and Travancore and an inserted clause in 1701 that Travancore would aid Cochin in putting down the nobles of Cochin
Leading nobles of Cochin were brought to Tripunithra and asked to take an Oath of allegiance to the Rajas of Cochin and Travancore. After this, says P. K. S. Raja, the nobles of Cochin like those of Travancore lost their political powers

See also
 Jenmi

References

Indian surnames
Nair
Social groups of Kerala